Samad is a male Semitic given name. It may also refer to:

 Ṣamad, one of the names of God in Islam
 Samad (UAV)
 Samad (crater), crater on Enceladus
 Samad, Iran
 Samad, Syria, village in southern Syria
 Samad al-Shan, archaeological site on Oman